Seminars in Cardiothoracic and Vascular Anesthesia is a quarterly peer-reviewed medical journal that covers research in the field of anesthesiology applied to cardiology. The editor-in-chiefs are Nathaen Weitzel and Miklos D. Kertai. It was established in 1997 and is currently published by SAGE Publications.

Abstracting and indexing 
Seminars in Cardiothoracic and Vascular Anesthesia is abstracted and indexed in CINAHL, EMBASE, MEDLINE, and Ovid.

External links 
 

SAGE Publishing academic journals
English-language journals
Anesthesiology and palliative medicine journals
Cardiology journals
Quarterly journals
Publications established in 1997